Demirci is a Turkish surname meaning "blacksmith". Notable people with the surname include:

 Muhammed Demirci (born 1995), Turkish footballer
 Tan Tolga Demirci (born 1974), Turkish director and writer
 Utkan Demirci (born c. 1977), Turkish scientist

See also
 Demirci (disambiguation)

Turkish-language surnames